Florence Mary Spry (9 August 1922 – November 2002) was an English cricketer who played as a right-handed batter. She appeared in 3 Test matches for England in 1951, all against Australia. Her highest score of 35 came in her last match, which England won by 137 runs. She played domestic cricket for Middlesex.

References

External links
 
 

1922 births
2002 deaths
Sportspeople from Birkenhead
England women Test cricketers
Middlesex women cricketers